Biochemical Systematics and Ecology is a peer-reviewed scientific journal covering chemotaxonomy and ecology. Tony Swain, one of the first editors of Phytochemistry started the sister journal Biochemical Systematics in 1973. It was renamed Biochemical Systematics and Ecology in the next year. The editors-in-chief are Severina Pacifico (Università degli Studi della Campania Luigi Vanvitelli) and Christian Zidorn (Kiel University).

References

External links

English-language journals
Elsevier academic journals
Ecology journals
Publications established in 1973
Systematics journals
Biochemistry journals
Bimonthly journals